International School Suva (ISS) is an independent, co-educational day school in Laucala Beach Estate in Suva, Fiji, offers preschool, primary and secondary education. The curriculum provided at International School Suva includes the International Baccalaureate (both the Primary Years Programme and the Diploma Programme), the International General Certificate of Secondary Education (IGCSE) and the Australian Capital Territory Senior Secondary Certificate (ACT) and Australian Tertiary Admission Rank (ATAR). The school was funded in 1973, and it provides an education for around 500 students representing over 40 different nations from preschool to secondary school. There are currently 80 staff, with 35 from local Fijian community and 11 from North America and the United Kingdom. ISS is the only international school that delivers the International Baccalaureate programme in Fiji. In addition, all year 11 and year 12 students are expected to complete either the Duke of Edinburgh's Award (DofE) programme or the Creative, Action, Service (CAS) programme as one of the extracurricular programmes.

Early Childhood and Primary School 
The principal of early childhood and primary school is Rebecca Clentworth. At present, the enrollment of early childhood and primary is around 330, with 30% local Fijian students and the remainder are international students from over 40 countries. The curriculum is built based on the International Baccalaureate Primary Years Programme (IBPYP) for students from early childhood (3 years) to year 5 (11 years).

Middle school 
The middle school consists of students from year 6  to year 8, and the principal of middle school is Kristopher Stice. Learning Support and English as a Second or Other Language (ESOL) lessons are provided for students that are seeking for extra help to meet their learning needs. These lessons are available from middle school (year 6 to year 8) to high school (year 9 to year 12). The subjects for middle school are divided into five areas, which are Mathematics, Science, English, Social Science and Music.

High school 
The high school consists of students from year 9 to year 12, and three international programmes are covered in high school. During year 9 and 10, International General Certificate of Secondary Education (IGCSE) is offered to all students. In year 11 and 12, students have two option to choose between either Australian Capital Territories (ACT) Senior Secondary Certificate and ATAR (Australian Tertiary Entrance Statement) or the International Baccalaureate Diploma Program (IBDP). In addition, there are also extracurricular programme that are eligible for high school students. During year 9 and year 10, students have an option to participate the Duke of Edinburgh's Bronze Award, and for senior students (year 11 and 12), the compliance of Duke of Edinburgh's Silver Award is required along with the academic curriculum. The principal of high school is Megan Navunisaravi. The subjects for year 11 and year 12 are divided into six areas, which are Languages, Humanities and Technology, Natural Sciences, Mathematics, Arts, Physical Education.

Extracurricular Programmes 
There are compulsory and optional extracurricular programmes that are available for middle school and high school students.

The first programme is Tuesday Afternoon Activities, and students have numerous options from sports programs including rugby, swimming, cricket, karate, yoga, scuba diving and sailing, to other programs including chess, model UN, robotic programming, Fijian Meke, film appreciation, Chinese cross stitch, debating, school production, IT, etc. These Tuesday Afternoon Activities are compulsory for all middle school and high school students excluding the senior students (Year 11 and 12), students are expected to take part in one of these activities on a weekly basis, and they are optional for senior students.

The second programme is the Creative, Activity, Service (CAS) programme for IB students. Along with academic studies, students enrolled in the International Baccalaureate Diploma Program are also expected to complete three strands of activities. "Creative" focuses on activities that promote creative thinking such as arts. "Activity" focuses on sports activities that promote physical health. "Service" refers to voluntary activities that demonstrate the autonomy of students and emphasize social responsibility.  Students need to participate each strands of CAS activities on a regular basis during their two years of study in the International Baccalaureate Diploma Program.

The third programme is the Duke of Edinburgh's Award (DofE) programme. The DofE bronze award is optional for all year 9 and 10 students along their IGCSE academic programme, and the DofE silver award is compulsory for senior ACT students, and optional for senior IB students.  Each level of DofE programme has four aspects, which are "Service", "Recreation", "Skills" and "Adventurous Journey". "Service" aspect is similar with "Service" in CAS programme, where social responsibility is assessed. "Recreation" is similar with "Activity", where students are encouraged to keep fit and enjoy a healthy life style. "Skills" aims to help students develop new abilities and broaden their studies. "Adventurous Journey" provides the students an opportunity to explore the nature environment through outdoor activities such as camping.

Production 
School production is directed by the year 12 students each year, however, all middle school and high school students are encouraged to participate the production. The production crews are split into several teams, including set design, costume coordinator, backstage, music and actors. School production is also an option for Tuesday Afternoon Activities. Below are a list of titles of the past productions:

 2008 -- "Little shop of horror" 
 2009 -- "Western division" 
 2010 -- "Lion king" 
 2011 -- "Beauty and the beast" 
 2012 -- "Pirates of the Caribbean" 
 2013 -- "Aladdin" 
 2014 -- "Wicked" 
 2015 -- "The Addams family" 
 2016 -- "Cheaper by the dozen" 
 2017 -- "Alice in wonderland" 
 2018 -- "Jungle book"

Scholarships 
International School Suva provides partial and full scholarships to Fijian resident students who has an outstanding academic potential, personal integrity and commitment to service. The scholarships are granted for students from other local schools who wish to transfer to ISS at year 11 or 12. Each year, there are four candidates that are eligible for the scholarships.

References

External links
 International School Suva 
International School Suva School Profile 2018

Buildings and structures in Suva
International schools in Oceania
Schools in Fiji